The 1992 Indianapolis Colts season was the 40th season for the team in the National Football League and ninth in Indianapolis. The Colts looked to improve on their dismal 1991 season, where they finished 1–15.

The Colts improved by eight games, recording a 9–7 record, and finished third in the AFC East division. It was the team's first season under the returning Ted Marchibroda, who had spent the previous five seasons as the quarterbacks coach and later offensive coordinator for the Buffalo Bills; Marchibroda had been the head coach of the team from 1975 until 1979 when it was in Baltimore. Marchibroda succeeded interim coach Rick Venturi, who coached the last eleven games of the 1991 season following the firing of Ron Meyer. Venturi remained on Marchibroda's staff as defensive coordinator.

Football Outsiders calls the 1992 Colts "possibly the luckiest team in NFL history", due to ranking the Colts as the second worst team in 1992, statistically. "The Colts finished 9–7 even though opponents outscored them 302–216", Football Outsiders continued. "They were 4–7 after losing 30–14 to Pittsburgh on November 22. Then they finished the year with a five-game winning streak – but they won those games by an average of four points. ... It didn't hurt that the Colts recovered 59 percent of fumbles that season and had a below-average schedule."

The Colts' 1,102 rushing yards is the lowest for any team in a single season in the 1990s.

Offseason 
On April 26, 1992, the Colts parted ways with Eric Dickerson after five seasons, trading him to the Los Angeles Raiders. Although they had gone to great lengths to acquire him in 1987 and he led the NFL in rushing while playing for them in 1988, the Colts' relationship with Dickerson soured during the 1990 season and he was suspended twice for conduct detrimental to the team. Dickerson was also unhappy with the Colts' fans blaming him for the team's lack of success and was said to be angry over the team's firing of Ron Meyer, his former college coach, during the previous season.

NFL Draft

Personnel

Staff

Roster

Regular season

Schedule

Standings

See also 
 History of the Indianapolis Colts
 Indianapolis Colts seasons
 Colts–Patriots rivalry

References 

Indianapolis Colts
Indianapolis Colts seasons
1992 in sports in Indiana